Richard Lynch (1940–2012) was an American actor.

Richard Lynch may also refer to:

Richard Lynch (Jesuit) (1611–1676), Irish theologian
Richard Lynch (Welsh actor) (born 1965), Welsh television and film actor
Richard Gare Lynch, mayor of Galway
Dick Lynch (1936–2008), American football player
Richard Lynch (musician) (born 1962), American country singer
Richard Lynch (cricketer) (born 1967), English cricketer
Richard J. Lynch (1921–1997), American law enforcement officer and politician